Bulldog Drummond at Bay was the ninth Bulldog Drummond novel. It was published in 1935 and written by H. C. McNeile under the pen name Sapper. It was filmed in 1937 and in  1947.

References

Bibliography

External links
 

1935 British novels
British crime novels
English novels
Hodder & Stoughton books
British novels adapted into films